Skaneateles Falls is a community on Skaneateles Creek in Onondaga County, New York, United States.

It is the closest community to Community Place, a former Fourierist utopian commune.

References

Hamlets in Onondaga County, New York